Mansour Muftah Faraj Bekhit Al-Abdullah, or simply Mansour Muftah (born  1955) is a Qatari former footballer who played as a forward. He was the top scorer in the Qatar Stars League a record 7 times, as well as being the top scorer for the Qatar national team till this day with 42 goals.

Club career

Youth career
Muftah attended the New Rayyan School; the school's football pitch was shared by Al Rayyan's first team. He joined in on an Al Rayyan training session, and scored two goals in a training match, prompting head coach Ashour Salem to ask him to join Al Rayyan's youth teams. Muftah rejected as he was a fan of Al Arabi, and was under pressure from his family to play for Al Arabi. Nonetheless, his sister-in-law presented him a contract with Al Rayyan, and he signed it without knowledge of the contents. Shortly after, his brother coerced him into signing a contract binding him to Al Arabi. This caused the two respective clubs to involve the QFA, which offered him a chance to select between the two clubs. He chose to play for Al Rayyan, a decision which elicited his brother to beat him. The next day, the Al Rayyan youth team won 3–1 against the Al Arabi youth team, with Muftah scoring 2 of the goals.

International career
Muftah made his international debut in the 1976 Gulf Cup of Nations against Saudi Arabia. He scored 4 goals in 6 games in the tournament, including a two-minute brace against Bahrain.  He also featured in the 1979 Gulf Cup of Nations held in Iraq, scoring a single goal against UAE, and again in 1982 Gulf Cup of Nations, scoring a goal against Oman.

In 1981, he participated in the World Military Cup held in Qatar, helping them finish as runners-up. From 1980 til 1986, the national team was coached by Evaristo de Macedo, who he describes as "undoubtedly the most influential person in his playing career". He competed in the men's tournament at the 1984 Summer Olympics.

He scored two goals and attained three assists in the group stage of the 1988 AFC Asian Cup held in Qatar. After Qatar made an early exit, Muftah, who was team captain, stated he felt humiliated for not at least reaching the knock-out stage. In a post-tournament interview, he apologized to the Qatari fans on behalf of the team. Despite losing the tournament, he earned 45,000 QR for winning 2 of the games.

He retired from international football in 1990, due to differences with the coach, Dino Sani. In total, he participated in 6 Gulf Cup of Nations and 3 AFC Asian Cups.

Mansour Muftah award
Starting from the 2013–14 Qatar Stars League, the top scorer award was renamed the "Mansour Muftah award" to honor his immense contribution to Qatari football.

Personal life
His brother, Faraj Muftah, is a volleyball referee. He participated in the Syria International Rally in 2004. He has a son named Tamim who plays in Al Rayyan.

Career statistics

Honours

Club
Al-Rayyan
Qatari League: 1975–76, 1977–78, 1981–82, 1983–84, 1985–86, 1989–90.
Confederation Cup: 1978, 1980, 1982, 1983
Qatar Sheikh Jassem Cup: 1992

Al-Wakrah
Qatar Sheikh Jassem Cup: 1998

International
Qatar
Gulf Cup of Nations Runner Up: 1984, 1990
Arab Nations Cup 4th place: 1985

Individual
Qatar national team top scorer of all time with 42 goals
Qatar Stars League top scorer 7 Times  : 1973–1974,1976-1977,1977–1978,1981–1982, 1982–1983, 1983–1984, 1985–1986
Qatar Stars League highest goal average with 22 goals in 12 matches.
1982 Gulf Club Champions Cup Top scorer : 6 goals.

References

External links

Qatar - List of Top Scorers
Mansoor Muftah on ar.wikipedia.org 
Ásia : Qatar : Mansoor Muftah 

People from Doha
Qatari footballers
Qatar international footballers
1955 births
Living people
Al-Rayyan SC players
Al-Wakrah SC players
Al-Sailiya SC players
Qatar Stars League players
1988 AFC Asian Cup players
1984 AFC Asian Cup players
1980 AFC Asian Cup players
Association football forwards
Olympic footballers of Qatar
Footballers at the 1984 Summer Olympics